The 2013 Eastern Kentucky Colonels football team represented Eastern Kentucky University during the 2013 NCAA Division I FCS football season. They were led by sixth year head coach Dean Hood and played their home games at Roy Kidd Stadium. They were a member of the Ohio Valley Conference (OVC). Eastern Kentucky had an overall record of 6–6 with a mark 4–4 in OVC play to finish in a tie for fifth place.

Schedule

Source: Schedule

Ranking movements

References

Eastern Kentucky
Eastern Kentucky Colonels football seasons
Eastern Kentucky Colonels football